The following is a timeline of the history of the city of Erfurt, Germany.

Prior to 19th century

 741 - Roman Catholic Diocese of Erfurt established.
 755 - Catholic diocese absorbed into that of Mainz.
 805 - Market rights granted by Charlemagne.
 932 - Religious Synod of Erfurt held.
 1060 - Benedictine  (monastery) first recorded mention.
 1094 - Old Synagogue construction begins 
 1109 - Landgrave of Thuringia in power.
 1255 - Municipal rights granted by bishop .
 1277 - Building of St. Augustine's Monastery begun.
 1290 - Rebuilt St. Mary's Cathedral consecrated.
 1325 - Stone Merchant's Bridge built.
 1349 - 21 March: Pogrom against Jews.
 1392 - University of Erfurt opens.
 1472 - Fire.
 1480 - Building of Cyriaksburg Citadel begun.
 1483 - Saxons in power per Treaty of Amorbach.
 1494 - Printing press in operation.
 1521 - Protestant reformation.
 1664 - Erfurt becomes part of the Electorate of Mainz.
 1665 - Foundation stone for Petersberg Citadel laid on 1 June 1665.
 1754 -  (learned society) formed.

19th century
 1802 - Erfurt becomes part of Prussia.
 1806 - 16 October: Prussian forces capitulate to French at Erfurt during the War of the Fourth Coalition.
 1807 - Principality of Erfurt of the French Empire established.
 1816 - University of Erfurt closes.
 1840 -  (synagogue) built.
 1847 - Erfurt Hauptbahnhof (train station) opens.
 1850 - Erfurt Union of German states created.
 1862 -  (manufactory) established.
 1863 -  (history society) founded.
 1865 -  (city archives) established.
 1869 - Nordhausen–Erfurt railway begins operating.
 1875 -  (town hall) built.
 1878 - Topf and Sons founded as an engineering firm. It later made crematoria for Nazi concentration camps.
 1878 - the Andreasstrasse Prison opened.
 1880 - Population: 53,254.
 1884 -  (synagogue) built.
 1891 - Meeting of the Social Democratic Party of Germany held in city; "Erfurt Program" adopted.
 1895 - Population: 78,174.

20th century

 1909 - Gutenbergschule (school) opens.
 1911 -  becomes part of Erfurt.(de)
 1919 - Population: 129,646.
 1937 - Population: 152,651.(de)
 1938 - Hochheim and  become part of Erfurt.(de)
 1940 -  begins.
 1945
 April: United States forces take city.
 July: City becomes part of the Soviet Occupation zone of Germany.
 1949 - City becomes part of the German Democratic Republic.
 1945 - Thüringische Landeszeitung (newspaper) begins publication.
 1950
 , Bischleben-Stedten, Dittelstedt, Gispersleben, Marbach, Möbisburg-Rhoda, and Schmira become part of Erfurt.(de)
 1952 -  (synagogue) built.
 1958 -  founded.
 1960 -  association of Erfurters who moved to West Germany founded.
 1971 - Population: 198,265.(de)
 1989 - Demonstrations against the GDR government, and citizens' occupation of the Stasi district headquarters and Stasi prison in Andreasstrasse.
 1990
 City becomes capital of state of Thuringia in the reunited nation of Germany.
  becomes mayor.
 Thüringer Allgemeine newspaper in publication.
 1993 - University of Erfurt reestablished.
 1994
 Roman Catholic Diocese of Erfurt reestablished.
 1995 - Naturkundemuseum Erfurt (museum) built.
 1997 - Erfurt Stadtbahn (tram) begins operating.

21st century

 2001 - April: Topf and Sons squat begins.
 2002 - 26 April: Erfurt school massacre occurs.
 2006 - Andreas Bausewein becomes mayor.
 2007 - Erfurter Bahn (railway) begins operating.
 2010 - Population: 204,994.(de)

See also
 
 List of mayors of Erfurt (1817–present; in German)
 
 
 Thuringia history (state)

References

This article incorporates information from the German Wikipedia.

Bibliography

in English

in German
  (bibliography)
 
 
 
 
 
 
 
 
 
 
 
 Stade, Heinz, et al. (2015) Erfurt: eine Stadt im Wandel, Leipzig: Edition Leipzig.

External links

 Links to fulltext city directories for Erfurt via Wikisource
 Items related to Erfurt, various dates (via Europeana)
 Items related to Erfurt, various dates (via Digital Public Library of America)

Erfurt
History of Erfurt